The 1920 Pittsburgh Pirates season was the 39th in franchise history; the 34th in the National League.

Regular season 
 Pirates pitcher Babe Adams had outstanding control, allowing only 18 bases on balls in 263 innings pitched.
 October 2, 1920: The Cincinnati Reds and the Pirates played in the last tripleheader of the 20th century. Umpire Peter Harrison officiated all three games.

Season standings

Record vs. opponents

Game log

|- bgcolor="ccffcc"
| 1 || April 14 || @ Cardinals || 5–4 (10) || Adams (1–0) || Goodwin || Hamilton (1) || — || 1–0
|- bgcolor="ffbbbb"
| 2 || April 15 || @ Cardinals || 2–3 || Schupp || Cooper (0–1) || — || — || 1–1
|- bgcolor="ccffcc"
| 3 || April 16 || @ Cardinals || 5–0 || Carlson (1–0) || Sherdel || — || — || 2–1
|- bgcolor="ccffcc"
| 4 || April 17 || @ Cardinals || 3–0 (13) || Ponder (1–0) || Haines || — || — || 3–1
|- bgcolor="ccffcc"
| 5 || April 18 || @ Reds || 2–1 || Adams (2–0) || Ruether || — || — || 4–1
|- bgcolor="ccffcc"
| 6 || April 21 || @ Reds || 5–3 || Cooper (1–1) || Ring || — || — || 5–1
|- bgcolor="ffbbbb"
| 7 || April 23 || Cardinals || 7–9 || Jacobs || Hamilton (0–1) || — || — || 5–2
|- bgcolor="ffbbbb"
| 8 || April 24 || Cardinals || 0–6 || Doak || Ponder (1–1) || — || — || 5–3
|- bgcolor="ccffcc"
| 9 || April 25 || @ Cubs || 4–1 (15) || Adams (3–0) || Hendrix || — || — || 6–3
|- bgcolor="ffbbbb"
| 10 || April 28 || @ Cubs || 1–11 || Alexander || Cooper (1–2) || — || — || 6–4
|- bgcolor="ffbbbb"
| 11 || April 29 || Reds || 2–8 || Ring || Carlson (1–1) || — || — || 6–5
|-

|- bgcolor="ffbbbb"
| 12 || May 1 || Reds || 1–7 || Ruether || Adams (3–1) || — || — || 6–6
|- bgcolor="ccffcc"
| 13 || May 2 || @ Reds || 3–0 || Cooper (2–2) || Sallee || — || — || 7–6
|- bgcolor="ccffcc"
| 14 || May 5 || Cubs || 2–0 || Adams (4–1) || Martin || — || — || 8–6
|- bgcolor="ccffcc"
| 15 || May 6 || Cubs || 3–1 || Cooper (3–2) || Hendrix || — || — || 9–6
|- bgcolor="ffbbbb"
| 16 || May 7 || Cubs || 4–6 || Alexander || Carlson (1–2) || — || — || 9–7
|- bgcolor="ffbbbb"
| 17 || May 8 || Cubs || 1–4 || Vaughn || Hamilton (0–2) || — || — || 9–8
|- bgcolor="ffbbbb"
| 18 || May 9 || @ Cubs || 7–8 || Martin || Adams (4–2) || Carter || — || 9–9
|- bgcolor="ccffcc"
| 19 || May 10 || Phillies || 3–1 || Cooper (4–2) || Causey || — || — || 10–9
|- bgcolor="ccffcc"
| 20 || May 12 || Phillies || 5–3 || Hamilton (1–2) || Rixey || — || — || 11–9
|- bgcolor="ffbbbb"
| 21 || May 15 || Giants || 0–2 || Nehf || Adams (4–3) || — || 12,000 || 11–10
|- bgcolor="ccffcc"
| 22 || May 17 || Giants || 7–6 (15) || Ponder (2–1) || Douglas || — || 6,000 || 12–10
|- bgcolor="ccffcc"
| 23 || May 18 || Braves || 7–2 || Hamilton (2–2) || Oeschger || — || — || 13–10
|- bgcolor="ccffcc"
| 24 || May 19 || Braves || 2–1 || Cooper (5–2) || McQuillan || — || — || 14–10
|- bgcolor="ccffcc"
| 25 || May 20 || Braves || 5–1 || Adams (5–3) || Fillingim || — || — || 15–10
|- bgcolor="ccffcc"
| 26 || May 21 || Braves || 9–0 || Carlson (2–2) || Eayrs || — || — || 16–10
|- bgcolor="ffbbbb"
| 27 || May 22 || Robins || 1–4 || Grimes || Cooper (5–3) || — || 18,000 || 16–11
|- bgcolor="ccffcc"
| 28 || May 23 || @ Robins || 1–0 || Ponder (3–1) || Pfeffer || — || 10,000 || 17–11
|- bgcolor="ffbbbb"
| 29 || May 24 || Robins || 0–1 || Mamaux || Adams (5–4) || — || 2,500 || 17–12
|- bgcolor="ccffcc"
| 30 || May 25 || Robins || 2–0 || Carlson (3–2) || Cadore || — || 3,000 || 18–12
|- bgcolor="ffbbbb"
| 31 || May 26 || Robins || 2–3 || Grimes || Wisner (0–1) || — || — || 18–13
|- bgcolor="ffbbbb"
| 32 || May 28 || @ Reds || 1–6 || Ruether || Cooper (5–4) || — || — || 18–14
|- bgcolor="ffbbbb"
| 33 || May 29 || @ Reds || 2–3 || Luque || Carlson (3–3) || — || — || 18–15
|- bgcolor="ffbbbb"
| 34 || May 30 || @ Reds || 3–5 || Sallee || Wisner (0–2) || — || — || 18–16
|- bgcolor="ffbbbb"
| 35 || May 31 || Cardinals || 4–5 || Sherdel || Ponder (3–2) || Jacobs || — || 18–17
|- bgcolor="ccffcc"
| 36 || May 31 || Cardinals || 7–4 || Cooper (6–4) || Doak || Carlson (1) || — || 19–17
|-

|- bgcolor="ffbbbb"
| 37 || June 1 || Cardinals || 4–5 (15) || Haines || Ponder (3–3) || — || — || 19–18
|- bgcolor="ffbbbb"
| 38 || June 2 || Cardinals || 2–6 || Schupp || Carlson (3–4) || — || — || 19–19
|- bgcolor="ccffcc"
| 39 || June 6 || @ Reds || 3–1 (10) || Cooper (7–4) || Ruether || — || — || 20–19
|- bgcolor="ffbbbb"
| 40 || June 9 || @ Braves || 6–7 (10) || Fillingim || Adams (5–5) || — || — || 20–20
|- bgcolor="ffbbbb"
| 41 || June 10 || @ Braves || 1–2 || Scott || Cooper (7–5) || — || — || 20–21
|- bgcolor="ffbbbb"
| 42 || June 11 || @ Braves || 0–3 || Fillingim || Hamilton (2–3) || — || — || 20–22
|- bgcolor="ccffcc"
| 43 || June 12 || @ Phillies || 6–4 || Carlson (4–4) || Rixey || — || 4,000 || 21–22
|- bgcolor="ccffcc"
| 44 || June 14 || @ Phillies || 6–1 || Cooper (8–5) || Gallia || — || — || 22–22
|- bgcolor="ccffcc"
| 45 || June 15 || @ Phillies || 7–6 (10) || Ponder (4–3) || Causey || — || — || 23–22
|- bgcolor="ffbbbb"
| 46 || June 18 || @ Giants || 4–5 || Barnes || Cooper (8–6) || — || 1,000 || 23–23
|- bgcolor="ccffcc"
| 47 || June 19 || @ Giants || 3–0 || Adams (6–5) || Nehf || — || 15,000 || 24–23
|- bgcolor="ffbbbb"
| 48 || June 20 || @ Giants || 0–8 || Douglas || Carlson (4–5) || — || 23,000 || 24–24
|- bgcolor="ccffcc"
| 49 || June 22 || @ Robins || 9–7 || Cooper (9–6) || Pfeffer || — || 5,000 || 25–24
|- bgcolor="ffbbbb"
| 50 || June 23 || @ Robins || 2–5 || Marquard || Carlson (4–6) || — || — || 25–25
|- bgcolor="ffbbbb"
| 51 || June 24 || @ Robins || 2–6 || Mamaux || Adams (6–6) || — || 3,500 || 25–26
|- bgcolor="ccffcc"
| 52 || June 25 || Cubs || 6–3 || Cooper (10–6) || Hendrix || — || — || 26–26
|- bgcolor="ccffcc"
| 53 || June 26 || Cubs || 9–4 || Ponder (5–3) || Vaughn || — || — || 27–26
|- bgcolor="ccffcc"
| 54 || June 27 || @ Cubs || 8–3 || Carlson (5–6) || Alexander || Cooper (1) || — || 28–26
|- bgcolor="ffbbbb"
| 55 || June 28 || @ Cubs || 2–5 || Tyler || Adams (6–7) || — || — || 28–27
|- bgcolor="ffbbbb"
| 56 || June 28 || @ Cubs || 4–5 || Gaw || Ponder (5–4) || — || — || 28–28
|- bgcolor="ccffcc"
| 57 || June 29 || @ Cubs || 4–3 (11) || Cooper (11–6) || Martin || — || — || 29–28
|- bgcolor="ffbbbb"
| 58 || June 29 || @ Cubs || 3–14 || Hendrix || Meador (0–1) || — || — || 29–29
|- bgcolor="ffbbbb"
| 59 || June 30 || @ Cubs || 0–1 || Vaughn || Ponder (5–5) || — || — || 29–30
|-

|- bgcolor="ccffcc"
| 60 || July 1 || @ Cardinals || 6–2 (10) || Carlson (6–6) || Sherdel || Adams (1) || — || 30–30
|- bgcolor="ffbbbb"
| 61 || July 2 || @ Cardinals || 0–3 || Doak || Hamilton (2–4) || — || — || 30–31
|- bgcolor="ccffcc"
| 62 || July 3 || @ Cardinals || 3–1 || Cooper (12–6) || Goodwin || — || — || 31–31
|- bgcolor="ffbbbb"
| 63 || July 4 || @ Reds || 0–5 || Ruether || Adams (6–8) || — || — || 31–32
|- bgcolor="ccffcc"
| 64 || July 5 || Reds || 4–1 || Carlson (7–6) || Fisher || — || — || 32–32
|- bgcolor="ccffcc"
| 65 || July 5 || Reds || 6–5 (11) || Hamilton (3–4) || Luque || — || — || 33–32
|- bgcolor="ffbbbb"
| 66 || July 6 || Reds || 2–7 || Ring || Meador (0–2) || — || — || 33–33
|- bgcolor="ccffcc"
| 67 || July 7 || Phillies || 2–1 || Cooper (13–6) || Smith || — || — || 34–33
|- bgcolor="ccffcc"
| 68 || July 8 || Phillies || 1–0 || Adams (7–8) || Meadows || — || — || 35–33
|- bgcolor="ffbbbb"
| 69 || July 9 || Phillies || 1–4 || Rixey || Carlson (7–7) || — || — || 35–34
|- bgcolor="ffbbbb"
| 70 || July 10 || Phillies || 7–8 (11) || Meadows || Cooper (13–7) || — || — || 35–35
|- bgcolor="ffbbbb"
| 71 || July 10 || Phillies || 1–3 || Hubbell || Ponder (5–6) || — || — || 35–36
|- bgcolor="ccffcc"
| 72 || July 12 || Braves || 3–2 (11) || Adams (8–8) || Fillingim || — || — || 36–36
|- bgcolor="ccffcc"
| 73 || July 13 || Braves || 5–2 || Carlson (8–7) || Scott || — || — || 37–36
|- bgcolor="ccffcc"
| 74 || July 14 || Braves || 4–3 || Cooper (14–7) || Oeschger || — || — || 38–36
|- bgcolor="ccffcc"
| 75 || July 15 || Braves || 9–8 || Carlson (9–7) || Watson || — || — || 39–36
|- bgcolor="ffbbbb"
| 76 || July 16 || Giants || 0–7 (17) || Benton || Hamilton (3–5) || — || 4,000 || 39–37
|- bgcolor="ccffcc"
| 77 || July 17 || Giants || 2–0 || Adams (9–8) || Toney || — || — || 40–37
|- bgcolor="ffbbbb"
| 78 || July 17 || Giants || 2–4 || Barnes || Carlson (9–8) || — || 25,000 || 40–38
|- bgcolor="ffbbbb"
| 79 || July 20 || Giants || 2–5 || Nehf || Cooper (14–8) || — || 3,000 || 40–39
|- bgcolor="ccffcc"
| 80 || July 21 || Robins || 4–3 || Ponder (6–6) || Marquard || — || 3,800 || 41–39
|- bgcolor="ccffcc"
| 81 || July 22 || Robins || 5–2 || Carlson (10–8) || Cadore || — || 4,000 || 42–39
|- bgcolor="ffbbbb"
| 82 || July 23 || Robins || 5–6 || Smith || Adams (9–9) || — || 4,000 || 42–40
|- bgcolor="ccffcc"
| 83 || July 24 || Robins || 5–1 || Cooper (15–8) || Grimes || — || 15,000 || 43–40
|- bgcolor="ccffcc"
| 84 || July 25 || @ Robins || 5–4 || Ponder (7–6) || Mitchell || — || 22,000 || 44–40
|- bgcolor="ffbbbb"
| 85 || July 26 || @ Robins || 4–6 || Smith || Carlson (10–9) || — || — || 44–41
|- bgcolor="ccffcc"
| 86 || July 27 || @ Phillies || 7–1 || Hamilton (4–5) || Meadows || — || — || 45–41
|- bgcolor="ccffcc"
| 87 || July 28 || @ Phillies || 6–3 || Cooper (16–8) || Smith || — || — || 46–41
|- bgcolor="ffbbbb"
| 88 || July 28 || @ Phillies || 4–5 || Causey || Adams (9–10) || Gallia || — || 46–42
|- bgcolor="ffbbbb"
| 89 || July 29 || @ Phillies || 3–7 || Rixey || Ponder (7–7) || — || — || 46–43
|- bgcolor="ffbbbb"
| 90 || July 30 || @ Phillies || 2–7 || Hubbell || Carlson (10–10) || — || — || 46–44
|- bgcolor="ccffcc"
| 91 || July 31 || @ Braves || 4–2 || Cooper (17–8) || Rudolph || — || — || 47–44
|- bgcolor="ffbbbb"
| 92 || July 31 || @ Braves || 1–6 || Fillingim || Hamilton (4–6) || — || — || 47–45
|-

|- bgcolor="ccffcc"
| 93 || August 2 || @ Braves || 3–2 || Adams (10–10) || Oeschger || Carlson (2) || — || 48–45
|- bgcolor="ccffcc"
| 94 || August 3 || @ Braves || 3–2 || Ponder (8–7) || McQuillan || — || — || 49–45
|- bgcolor="ccffcc"
| 95 || August 4 || @ Braves || 3–0 || Cooper (18–8) || Fillingim || — || — || 50–45
|- bgcolor="ccffcc"
| 96 || August 5 || @ Robins || 8–5 (10) || Hamilton (5–6) || Grimes || — || 7,000 || 51–45
|- bgcolor="ccffcc"
| 97 || August 7 || @ Robins || 7–0 || Adams (11–10) || Smith || — || 12,000 || 52–45
|- bgcolor="ffbbbb"
| 98 || August 8 || @ Robins || 1–2 || Cadore || Ponder (8–8) || — || 20,000 || 52–46
|- bgcolor="ffbbbb"
| 99 || August 9 || @ Giants || 0–9 || Nehf || Cooper (18–9) || — || 12,000 || 52–47
|- bgcolor="ffbbbb"
| 100 || August 11 || @ Giants || 1–5 || Benton || Hamilton (5–7) || — || — || 52–48
|- bgcolor="ffbbbb"
| 101 || August 11 || @ Giants || 3–6 || Douglas || Carlson (10–11) || — || 20,000 || 52–49
|- bgcolor="ccffcc"
| 102 || August 12 || @ Giants || 2–0 || Adams (12–10) || Barnes || — || 15,000 || 53–49
|- bgcolor="ffbbbb"
| 103 || August 13 || Cardinals || 2–4 || Schupp || Cooper (18–10) || — || — || 53–50
|- bgcolor="ffbbbb"
| 104 || August 14 || Cardinals || 0–1 || Doak || Ponder (8–9) || — || — || 53–51
|- bgcolor="ffffff"
| 105 || August 14 || Cardinals || 1–1 (8) ||  ||  || — || — || 53–51
|- bgcolor="ccffcc"
| 106 || August 15 || @ Cardinals || 4–2 (11) || Hamilton (6–7) || May || — || — || 54–51
|- bgcolor="ffbbbb"
| 107 || August 15 || @ Cardinals || 2–3 || Kircher || Wisner (0–3) || — || — || 54–52
|- bgcolor="ccffcc"
| 108 || August 16 || @ Cardinals || 3–2 || Adams (13–10) || Haines || — || — || 55–52
|- bgcolor="ccffcc"
| 109 || August 17 || @ Cardinals || 10–6 || Cooper (19–10) || Schupp || Carlson (3) || — || 56–52
|- bgcolor="ffbbbb"
| 110 || August 19 || Phillies || 2–5 (12) || Enzmann || Hamilton (6–8) || — || — || 56–53
|- bgcolor="ffbbbb"
| 111 || August 20 || Phillies || 2–4 (11) || Betts || Ponder (8–10) || — || — || 56–54
|- bgcolor="ffbbbb"
| 112 || August 21 || Phillies || 1–3 || Rixey || Cooper (19–11) || — || — || 56–55
|- bgcolor="ccffcc"
| 113 || August 21 || Phillies || 5–0 || Adams (14–10) || Hubbell || — || — || 57–55
|- bgcolor="ffbbbb"
| 114 || August 23 || Robins || 0–3 || Pfeffer || Hamilton (6–9) || — || 3,500 || 57–56
|- bgcolor="ccffcc"
| 115 || August 24 || Robins || 4–3 || Carlson (11–11) || Grimes || — || 3,000 || 58–56
|- bgcolor="ffbbbb"
| 116 || August 25 || Robins || 3–4 || Mamaux || Ponder (8–11) || — || 4,000 || 58–57
|- bgcolor="ccffcc"
| 117 || August 26 || Braves || 2–1 || Adams (15–10) || McQuillan || — || — || 59–57
|- bgcolor="ccffcc"
| 118 || August 27 || Braves || 8–1 || Cooper (20–11) || Oeschger || — || — || 60–57
|- bgcolor="ffbbbb"
| 119 || August 28 || Braves || 1–5 || Fillingim || Hamilton (6–10) || — || — || 60–58
|- bgcolor="ccffcc"
| 120 || August 30 || Giants || 4–2 || Carlson (12–11) || Douglas || — || — || 61–58
|- bgcolor="ccffcc"
| 121 || August 30 || Giants || 2–1 || Ponder (9–11) || Toney || — || 5,000 || 62–58
|- bgcolor="ccffcc"
| 122 || August 31 || Giants || 6–5 || Wisner (1–3) || Nehf || Hamilton (2) || — || 63–58
|-

|- bgcolor="ccffcc"
| 123 || September 1 || Giants || 4–3 || Cooper (21–11) || Benton || — || — || 64–58
|- bgcolor="ffbbbb"
| 124 || September 2 || Giants || 1–5 || Barnes || Hamilton (6–11) || — || 5,000 || 64–59
|- bgcolor="ffbbbb"
| 125 || September 3 || Cubs || 2–4 (13) || Vaughn || Carlson (12–12) || — || — || 64–60
|- bgcolor="ccffcc"
| 126 || September 4 || Cubs || 3–2 || Adams (16–10) || Tyler || Cooper (2) || — || 65–60
|- bgcolor="ffbbbb"
| 127 || September 5 || @ Cubs || 0–2 || Alexander || Ponder (9–12) || — || — || 65–61
|- bgcolor="ffbbbb"
| 128 || September 6 || Cubs || 2–5 || Martin || Cooper (21–12) || — || — || 65–62
|- bgcolor="ccffcc"
| 129 || September 6 || Cubs || 12–1 || Hamilton (7–11) || Bailey || — || — || 66–62
|- bgcolor="ccffcc"
| 130 || September 7 || Cubs || 7–4 || Carlson (13–12) || Vaughn || Adams (2) || — || 67–62
|- bgcolor="ccffcc"
| 131 || September 9 || @ Phillies || 7–6 || Ponder (10–12) || Causey || Hamilton (3) || — || 68–62
|- bgcolor="ccffcc"
| 132 || September 10 || @ Phillies || 8–3 || Cooper (22–12) || Hubbell || — || — || 69–62
|- bgcolor="ccffcc"
| 133 || September 11 || @ Phillies || 3–2 || Hamilton (8–11) || Meadows || — || — || 70–62
|- bgcolor="ffbbbb"
| 134 || September 13 || @ Braves || 0–3 || Scott || Adams (16–11) || — || — || 70–63
|- bgcolor="ccffcc"
| 135 || September 15 || @ Braves || 2–1 || Cooper (23–12) || McQuillan || — || — || 71–63
|- bgcolor="ffbbbb"
| 136 || September 15 || @ Braves || 1–4 || Fillingim || Carlson (13–13) || — || — || 71–64
|- bgcolor="ccffcc"
| 137 || September 16 || @ Giants || 3–1 || Hamilton (9–11) || Barnes || — || — || 72–64
|- bgcolor="ffbbbb"
| 138 || September 16 || @ Giants || 0–4 || Nehf || Ponder (10–13) || — || 10,000 || 72–65
|- bgcolor="ffbbbb"
| 139 || September 17 || @ Giants || 3–4 (10) || Toney || Adams (16–12) || — || 6,000 || 72–66
|- bgcolor="ffbbbb"
| 140 || September 18 || @ Giants || 7–8 || Douglas || Ponder (10–14) || — || 12,000 || 72–67
|- bgcolor="ffbbbb"
| 141 || September 19 || @ Robins || 3–4 || Pfeffer || Cooper (23–13) || — || 25,000 || 72–68
|- bgcolor="ffbbbb"
| 142 || September 20 || @ Robins || 1–2 (10) || Mamaux || Hamilton (9–12) || — || 6,000 || 72–69
|- bgcolor="ccffcc"
| 143 || September 22 || Reds || 2–0 || Adams (17–12) || Luque || — || — || 73–69
|- bgcolor="ccffcc"
| 144 || September 22 || Reds || 3–1 || Ponder (11–14) || Ruether || — || — || 74–69
|- bgcolor="ccffcc"
| 145 || September 23 || Reds || 4–0 || Cooper (24–13) || Eller || — || — || 75–69
|- bgcolor="ccffcc"
| 146 || September 24 || Cardinals || 12–7 || Hamilton (10–12) || Schupp || — || — || 76–69
|- bgcolor="ccffcc"
| 147 || September 25 || Cardinals || 2–1 (12) || Zinn (1–0) || Sherdel || — || — || 77–69
|- bgcolor="ffbbbb"
| 148 || September 25 || Cardinals || 1–3 || Haines || Ponder (11–15) || — || — || 77–70
|- bgcolor="ffbbbb"
| 149 || September 26 || @ Reds || 0–8 || Napier || Adams (17–13) || — || — || 77–71
|- bgcolor="ffbbbb"
| 150 || September 28 || @ Reds || 0–2 || Eller || Cooper (24–14) || — || — || 77–72
|- bgcolor="ffbbbb"
| 151 || September 28 || @ Reds || 3–5 || Brenton || Hamilton (10–13) || — || — || 77–73
|-

|- bgcolor="ffbbbb"
| 152 || October 2 || Reds || 4–13 || Fisher || Cooper (24–15) || — || — || 77–74
|- bgcolor="ffbbbb"
| 153 || October 2 || Reds || 3–7 || Brenton || Zinn (1–1) || — || — || 77–75
|- bgcolor="ccffcc"
| 154 || October 2 || Reds || 6–0 (6) || Morrison (1–0) || Napier || — || — || 78–75
|- bgcolor="ccffcc"
| 155 || October 3 || @ Cubs || 4–3 || Carlson (14–13) || Tyler || — || — || 79–75
|-

|-
| Legend:       = Win       = Loss       = TieBold = Pirates team member

Opening Day lineup

Roster

Player stats

Batting

Starters by position 
Note: Pos = Position; G = Games played; AB = At bats; H = Hits; Avg. = Batting average; HR = Home runs; RBI = Runs batted in

Other batters 
Note: G = Games played; AB = At bats; H = Hits; Avg. = Batting average; HR = Home runs; RBI = Runs batted in

Pitching

Starting pitchers 
Note: G = Games pitched; IP = Innings pitched; W = Wins; L = Losses; ERA = Earned run average; SO = Strikeouts

Other pitchers 
Note: G = Games pitched; IP = Innings pitched; W = Wins; L = Losses; ERA = Earned run average; SO = Strikeouts

Relief pitchers 
Note: G = Games pitched; W = Wins; L = Losses; SV = Saves; ERA = Earned run average; SO = Strikeouts

Farm system

References

External links
 1920 Pittsburgh Pirates team page at Baseball Reference
 1920 Pittsburgh Pirates Page at Baseball Almanac

Pittsburgh Pirates seasons
Pittsburgh Pirates season
Pittsburg Pir